Juan de Dios Reyes, III (born March 12, 1968, in Bronx, New York) is a Republican politician and attorney in New York City.

Early life
Reyes was born to Dr. Juan de Dios Reyes Alvarado, II and Catherine Reyes (née Darmanin) on March 12, 1968, at Bronx Lebanon Hospital.  He grew up in the family home in Forest Hills Gardens with his parents, his brother Alexander, and his sister Katherine.

Education
Reyes attended Our Lady Queen of Martyrs elementary school in Forest Hills.  He transferred to the St. David's School in Manhattan for Middle School and attended The Browning School for high school.  He graduated from Emory University with a bachelor's degree in political science.  He later attended Quinnipiac Law School in Connecticut, where he earned his JD.

Career
After law school Reyes joined the Giuliani Administration in New York City. He worked at the Department of Youth Services as deputy general counsel. Later he served as a counsel in the Office of the Mayor, and then as general counsel at the Board of Standards and Appeals (BSA).

He is currently a partner at the international law firm, Reed Smith, in the New York Office.

Political career
Reyes was a candidate for the Republican nomination for the 15th New York State Senate District in 2012. He was endorsed by the Queens Republican Party.

Family
Reyes married Meaghan O'Brien in 2002. The couple has three (3) daughters.

References

1968 births
Living people
People from the Bronx
New York (state) Republicans
New York (state) lawyers
Browning School alumni
People from Forest Hills, Queens
Emory University alumni
Quinnipiac University alumni